Paroedura guibeae, Guibé's ground gecko, is a species of lizard in the family Gekkonidae. It is endemic to Madagascar.

References

Paroedura
Reptiles of Madagascar
Reptiles described in 1974
Taxa named by James R. Dixon